Stade Sapiac is a rugby union stadium in Montauban, France.

References

Rugby union stadiums in France